The 6th Grand National Assembly of Turkey existed from 26 March 1939 to 8 March 1943. 
There were 470 MPs in the parliament all of which were the members of the Republican People's Party (CHP).

Main parliamentary milestones 
Some of the important events in the history of the parliament are the following:
26 March 1939 – General elections
3 April 1939 – İsmet İnönü  was elected as the president of Turkey for the second time
3 April 1939 – Refik Saydam of CHP formed the 12th government of Turkey
30 June 1939 – Parliament approved merging Hatay Republic to Turkey
17 April 1940 – Law 2780 : Village Institutes were established
9 July 1942 – Upon Refik Saydam’s death, Şükrü Saracoğlu of CHP formed the 13th government of Turkey
11 November 1942 – Law 4305 : Wealth tax
28 February 1943 – General Elections

References

1939 establishments in Turkey
1943 disestablishments in Turkey
06
6th parliament of Turkey
Republican People's Party (Turkey)
Political history of Turkey